Christian Lardé (3 February 1930 –16 November 2012)

Biography 
Lardé was awarded the first prize of flute and chamber music at the Conservatoire de Paris.

In 1951, he obtained the 2nd prize of the Geneva International Music Competition.

From 1959 to 1978, he was a member of Marie-Claire Jamet's quintet.

From 1970, he taught chamber music at the Conservatoire de Paris.

References

External links 
 Christian Lardé on flute.etoile-b.com (accessdate 24 April 2017)
 Christian Lardé on Discogs
 Entr'acte on YouTube
 Partial discography on Via Nova
  (discography)

French classical flautists
Academic staff of the Conservatoire de Paris
Musicians from Paris
1930 births
2012 deaths
20th-century classical musicians
20th-century flautists